Stylogyne is a genus of shrubs and trees in the family Primulaceae. Its members are found throughout tropical parts of the Americas, with the greatest diversity in South America. It is closely related to the genera Ardisia and Geissanthus, and various species have been transferred between the three genera. All three were formerly placed in the family Myrsinaceae, which is now treated as a subfamily (Myrsinoideae) of the Primulaceae.

Species
The following species of Stylogyne are recognised by The Plant List:

Stylogyne aguarunana Pipoly & Ricketson
Stylogyne ardisioides (Kunth) Mez
Stylogyne atra Mez
Stylogyne bracteolata (Lundell) Pipoly
Stylogyne canaliculata (Lodd.) Mez
Stylogyne darienensis Lundell
Stylogyne depauperata Mez
Stylogyne dusenii Ricketson & Pipoly
Stylogyne glomeruliflora Cuatrec.
Stylogyne hayesii Mez
Stylogyne incognita Pipoly
Stylogyne indecora Mez
Stylogyne lasseri (Lundell) Pipoly
Stylogyne lateriflora (Sw.) Mez
Stylogyne laxiflora Mez
Stylogyne leptantha (Miq.) Mez
Stylogyne lhotzkyana (A.DC.) Mez
Stylogyne longifolia (Mart. ex Miq.) Mez
Stylogyne martiana A.DC. 
Stylogyne mathewsii Mez
Stylogyne membranacea Pipoly
Stylogyne micrantha (Kunth) Mez
Stylogyne minutiflora Cuatrec.
Stylogyne nigricans (A.DC.) Mez
Stylogyne orinocensis (Kunth) Mez
Stylogyne pauciflora Mez
Stylogyne pucuroensis Ricketson & Pipoly
Stylogyne racemiflora Ricketson & Pipoly
Stylogyne rodriguesiana Pipoly
Stylogyne serpentina Mez
Stylogyne sordida Mez
Stylogyne turbacensis (Kunth) Mez
Stylogyne viridis (Lundell) Ricketson & Pipoly

References

Primulaceae
Primulaceae genera
Taxonomy articles created by Polbot